The 2003 FIA GT Anderstorp 500 km was the seventh round the 2003 FIA GT Championship.  It took place at the Scandinavian Raceway, Sweden, on 7 September 2003.

Official results
Class winners in bold.  Cars failing to complete 70% of winner's distance marked as Not Classified (NC).

Statistics
 Pole position – #2 Konrad Motorsport – 1:28.899
 Fastest lap – #2 Konrad Motorsport – 1:31.424
 Average speed – 152.700 km/h

References

 
 
 

A
FIA GT